The 2016–17 Montana State Bobcats women's basketball team represented Montana State University during the 2016–17 NCAA Division I women's basketball season. The Bobcats, led by eleventh year head coach Tricia Binford, played their home games at Brick Breeden Fieldhouse and are members of the Big Sky Conference.  The Bobcats won the Big Sky Conference regular season and tournament championships, earning their first NCAA Tournament appearance since 1993. They finished the season 25–7, 15–3 in Big Sky play. They lost in the first round to Washington.

Roster

Schedule

|-
!colspan=9 style="background:#0a1f62; color:#c1b465;"| Exhibition

|-
!colspan=9 style="background:#0a1f62; color:#c1b465;"| Non-conference regular season

|-
!colspan=9 style="background:#0a1f62; color:#c1b465;"| Big Sky regular season

|-
!colspan=9 style="background:#0a1f62; color:#c1b465;"| Big Sky Women's Tournament

|-
!colspan=9 style="background:#0a1f62; color:#c1b465;"| NCAA Women's Tournament

See also
2016–17 Montana State Bobcats men's basketball team

References

Montana State Bobcats women's basketball seasons
Montana State
Montana State